Azeem Sarwar (born 4 March 1991) is a Pakistani badminton player. In 2016, he was the men's doubles champion at the All Pakistan National ranking tournament. He also the runner-up at Pakistan International tournament in the men's doubles event partnered with Muhammad Irfan Saeed Bhatti. In 2017, he and Bhatti won the men's doubles title at the Nepal Annapurna International Badminton Championship.

Achievements

BWF International Challenge/Series 
Men's doubles

  BWF International Challenge tournament
  BWF International Series tournament
  BWF Future Series tournament

References

External links 
 

Living people
1991 births
Pakistani male badminton players
Badminton players at the 2018 Asian Games
Asian Games competitors for Pakistan
21st-century Pakistani people